Hans Eberle (28 September 1925 in Ulm – 2 April 1998) was a German footballer who competed in the 1952 Summer Olympics. The right back played for TSG Ulm (1946-1953), where Toni Turek, the 1954 World Champion, was among his teammates, and for the Stuttgart Kickers (1953-1957). After his career, he became a coach. He also worked as a primary school teacher.

References

1925 births
1998 deaths
German footballers
Association football defenders
Olympic footballers of Germany
Footballers at the 1952 Summer Olympics
Stuttgarter Kickers managers
Sportspeople from Ulm
Footballers from Baden-Württemberg
German football managers